PFC Sokol is a Russian association football club based in Saratov. In 2001 and 2002, Sokol played in the Russian Premier League. Currently the club plays in the third-level FNL 2.

History

The club was founded as Dynamo. It was known by this name until 1930 and in 1946–1953. Other club's names include Lokomotiv (1956–1960), Energiya (1954–1955), Sokol (1961–1994 and 1998–2005), and Sokol-PZD (1995–1997). "Sokol" is Russian for "falcon".

Dynamo did not enter the Soviet league until 1946, when they debuted in the Third Group and were promoted to the Second Group at the first time of asking. Dynamo played in the Second Group until 1949. After a period of absence in the league, the club entered Class B in 1954 under new name, Energia. After a considerable time spent in Class B, Sokol were eventually promoted to Class A, Group 2 in 1965. Sokol played there until 1970. In 1971–1991, they played in the Second League.

In 1992 Sokol entered the newly formed Russian First Division. They played in this division until 2000, never finishing lower than 10th, and eventually won it. The 2001 season was the best in club's history. Sokol were leading in mid-season, but could not keep up and finished 8th in the Top Division. Andrey Fedkov, Sokol's striker, was capped for Russia national team. The next year Sokol were relegated after finishing last in the league.

The club continued playing in the First Division since 2003. In 2005 Sokol finished last thanks to a points deduction for failing to pay for player transfer. Instead of starting in the Second Division in 2006, Sokol chose to play in the Amateur League. In addition, the club was renamed Sokol-Saratov.

Sokol reached the semifinals of the Soviet Cup in 1966/67 and of the Russian Cup in 2000/01.

Current squad
As of 20 February 2023, according to the Second League website.

Reserve squad
Sokol's reserve squad played professionally as FC Sokol-d Saratov in the Russian Third League in 1994.

Notable players
Had international caps for their respective countries. Players whose name is listed in bold represented their countries while playing for Sokol.

USSR/Russia
 Viktor Samokhin
   Dmitri Kuznetsov
  Vladimir Tatarchuk
  Dmitri Khlestov
  Andrei Piatnitski
 Albert Borzenkov
 Andrei Fedkov
 Denis Kolodin
 Aleksei Kosolapov
 Vladimir Lebed
 Andrei Semyonov
 Aleksandr Sheshukov
 Oleg Teryokhin
 Oleg Veretennikov

Former USSR countries
 Karapet Mikaelyan
 Deni Gaisumov
 Gennadi Bliznyuk
 Artem Chelyadinsky
 Alyaksandr Hrapkowski
 Petr Katchouro
 Vladimir Sheleg
 Vitali Trubila
 Vital Valadzyankow
 Zviad Jeladze
 Mikheil Jishkariani
 Ruslan Baltiev
 Vitaliy Kafanov
 Dmitriy Lyapkin
 Oleg Musin
 Maksim Nizovtsev
 Yevgeni Tarasov
 Sergey Timofeev

 Vladislavs Gabovs
 Raimondas Vainoras
 Serghei Epureanu
 Yuri Baturenko
 Andriy Annenkov
 Yuriy Hrytsyna
 Oleksandr Koval
 Hennadiy Orbu
 Vladyslav Prudius
 Dmytro Tiapushkin
 Victor Karpenko
 Maksim Shatskikh

Europe
 Senad Repuh
 Edin Šaranović
 Ovidiu Cuc

References

External links
Official website 

 
Football clubs in Russia
Sport in Saratov
1930 establishments in Russia
Association football clubs established in 1930